(LPI) is a pricing index used to calculate increases in components of scheme pension payments in the UK. Currently, the statutory requirement for occupational pension schemes is that pensions in payment must be increased by the lower of RPI and 2.5% . Usually the lesser of the annual increase in the Retail Prices Index(or Consumer Prices Index) and 5%, although the percentage limit can vary. 

From April 2011, the index used for LPI will be switched from RPI to CPI(Consumer Price Index). The announcement makes it clear that:
 this statutory requirement will apply to all rights a member has already accrued – not just future service rights
 if a pension is already in payment, a member will remain entitled to the increases already granted but future increases on the whole pension may be based on CPI not RPI; and
 schemes can provide greater increases if they wish.
The rate of revaluation for pensions in deferment will also change in a similar way (again, with revaluation already granted on an RPI basis being protected)

Usage
The Pensions Act 1995 required scheme pension payments arising from excess contributions to go up at the LPI. Excess contributions are defined as contributions that are not protected rights contributions from contracting out of State Earnings-Related Pension Scheme (SERPS) or the State second pension (S2P) or any Additional voluntary contributions (AVCs). Only contributions made after April 6, 1997 are required to increase at the LPI rate, so these contributions are known as post 1997 excess contributions.
The rules were later amended by the Pensions Act 2004 so that excess contributions made after April 6, 2005 only had to increase at the RPI rate capped at 2.5% instead of 5%.

In either case, the scheme can pay increases greater than the statutory minimum. The rules for payment increases only apply to scheme pensions, i.e. pension payments made from a defined benefits (DB or final salary) scheme. Payments arising from contributions into a money purchase pension scheme (also known as a defined contribution pension scheme) are not required to increase. This is because scheme members have the right to use their fund value to purchase an annuity with their own chosen rate of increase, which could be zero if a level pension is chosen. This right is known as the open market option (OMO). Following A-day, members also have the right to enter into an unsecured pension arrangement.

External links
The Pensions Advisory Service – LPI
Sharing Pensions – LPI
Summary of The Pensions Act 2004 by Scottish Life

Pensions in the United Kingdom